Pachynematus is a genus of common sawflies in the family Tenthredinidae. There are at least fifty described species in Pachynematus.

Species
These 54 species belong to the genus Pachynematus:

 Pachynematus acutiventris (Hellén, 1948) g
 Pachynematus aequalis Lindqvist, 1974 g
 Pachynematus albipennis (Hartig, 1837) g
 Pachynematus albiventris Lindqvist, 1958 g
 Pachynematus angustatus Lindqvist, 1949 g
 Pachynematus annulatus (Gimmerthal, 1834) g
 Pachynematus apicalis (Hartig, 1837) g
 Pachynematus aurantiacus Marlatt, 1896 b
 Pachynematus calcicola Benson, 1948 g
 Pachynematus caucasicus Liston, Taeger & Blank, 2009 g
 Pachynematus clibrichellus (Cameron, 1878) g
 Pachynematus clitellatus (Serville, 1823) g
 Pachynematus corniger b
 Pachynematus declinatus (Forster, 1854) g
 Pachynematus dentatus Lindqvist, 1937 g
 Pachynematus duplex (Serville, 1823) g
 Pachynematus excisus (Thomson, 1862) g
 Pachynematus extensicornis (Norton) i c g b (grass sawfly)
 Pachynematus fallax (Serville, 1823) g
 Pachynematus gehrsi (Konow, 1904) g
 Pachynematus glabriceps Lindqvist, 1949 g
 Pachynematus hungaricus Haris, 2001 g
 Pachynematus imperfectus (Zaddach, 1876) g
 Pachynematus infirmus (Foerster, 1854) g
 Pachynematus inopinatus Lindqvist, 1949 g
 Pachynematus insignis (Hartig, 1840) g
 Pachynematus itoi Okutani, 1955 g
 Pachynematus kirbyi (Dahlbom, 1835) g
 Pachynematus laevigatus (Zaddach, 1882) g
 Pachynematus legirupus Konow, 1903 g
 Pachynematus lichtwardti Konow, 1903 g
 Pachynematus moerens (Foerster, 1854) g
 Pachynematus montanus (Zaddach, 1883) g
 Pachynematus nigerrimus Konow, 1903 g
 Pachynematus obductus (Hartig, 1837) g
 Pachynematus omega (Benson, 1955) g
 Pachynematus pallescens (Hartig, 1837) g
 Pachynematus parvilabris (Thomson, 1862) g
 Pachynematus pumilio Konow, 1903 g
 Pachynematus punctifrons Malaise, 1921 g
 Pachynematus rugosulus Lindqvist, 1959 g
 Pachynematus rumicis (Linnaeus, 1758) g
 Pachynematus salicicola Enslin, 1916 g
 Pachynematus scutellatus (Hartig, 1837) g
 Pachynematus smithae Ross, 1945 g
 Pachynematus styx Benson, 1958 g
 Pachynematus sulcatus Benson, 1948 g
 Pachynematus taegeri (Lacourt, 1996) g
 Pachynematus tatricus Roller & Haris, 2008 g
 Pachynematus tenuiserra Lindqvist, 1949 g
 Pachynematus udus (Holmgren, 1883) g
 Pachynematus vaginosus (Konow, 1903) g
 Pachynematus vagus (Fabricius, 1781) g
 Pachynematus xanthocarpus (Hartig, 1840) g

Data sources: i = ITIS, c = Catalogue of Life, g = GBIF, b = Bugguide.net

References

External links

 

Tenthredinidae
Taxa named by Friedrich Wilhelm Konow
Articles created by Qbugbot